The 2017–18 Zanzibar Premier League season is the top level of football competition in Zanzibar.

Qualifying stage

Kanda ya Unguja
After 12 rounds (31 January 2018):

Kanda ya Pemba
After 22 rounds (9 April 2018):

Championship playoff
Qualified teams: 
Unguja (top four teams): KVZ, JKU, Zimamoto, Mafunzo
Pemba (top four teams): Mwenge, Jamhuri, Opec, Hardrock

Standings
Final table.

 1.JKU SCZ               14  10  3  1  33-15  33  Champions
 2.Zimamoto SC           14  10  2  2  21- 9  32
 3.KVZ SC                14   8  5  1  23- 7  29
 4.Mwenge (Wete)         14   5  3  6  19-19  18
 5.Mafunzo SC            14   4  3  7  12-13  15
 6. Hard Rock             14   3  3  8  12-25  12
 7.Jamhuri               14   2  5  7  11-19  11
 8.Opec                  14   2  0 12  17-41   6

References

Football competitions in Zanzibar
Zanzibar Premier League
Zanzibar Premier League
Zanzibar